Micropterix hyrcana is a species of moth belonging to the family Micropterigidae. It was described by Zagulajev in 1993. It is only known from Hyrcanian woods along the southern coast of the Caspian Sea from Azerbaijan to the Iranian province Golestan.

The habitat consists of edges of deciduous forests. Adults have been caught in June.

References

Micropterigidae
Moths described in 1993